Home of the Brave is a 1985 American documentary directed by Helena Solberg. The film was financed by the Corporation for Public Broadcasting.

Synopsis 
In this film, Native Americans – and only Native Americans – talk about the contemporary threats they are facing in modern times.

Cast 
 Ilka Tanya Payán ... Narration

References 

American documentary television films
PBS original programming
1980s American films